Cornelius Anthony (born July 3, 1978) is a former American football linebacker. He was originally signed by the San Francisco 49ers as an undrafted free agent in 2002. He played college football at Texas A&M.

Anthony also played for the Calgary Stampeders and Hamilton Tiger-Cats.

High school
He starred at Elkins High School in Missouri City, Texas where he earned District 16-5A Defensive MVP honors after posting 163 total tackles (25 for a loss), three interceptions and three fumble recoveries in addition to playing running back on offense. Also earned All-Greater Houston honors, was a finalist for the Houston Touchdown Club Defensive Player of the Year, and was an honorable mention all-state selection.

College
Anthony attended Texas A&M University, where he was a three-year starter. He finished his career with six sacks, 288 tackles, and a forced fumble. In a game against Nebraska during his senior year, he posted 18 tackles.

Professional

NFL
Anthony was signed as a free agent to the Washington Redskins, but did not appear in a game with the club. He was assigned to NFL Europe, where he played for the Barcelona Dragons.  He finished the year with two sacks, a team-leading 50 tackles, a forced fumble, and an interception.  He then returned to the U.S., where he played in 17 games over the 2003 and 2004 seasons for the San Francisco 49ers.  After being released by the 49ers, he was signed and subsequently released by the Denver Broncos.

CFL
Signed as a free agent on May 10, 2005 with the Calgary Stampeders. Appeared in 5 games during the 2005 season and recorded 3 special teams tackles. Became a starter during the 2006 season for Calgary. Finished the season with 40 defensive tackles, six quarterback sacks, two special team tackles, two tackles for a loss, one fumble recovery and one interception. Had his best professional season in 2007, making 56 tackles, recording 8 sacks, and recovering a fumble.

External links
Just Sports Stats
Cornelius Anthony at SI.com
Calgary Stampeders bio
A&M Bio

1978 births
Living people
People from Pineville, Louisiana
American football linebackers
Calgary Stampeders players
Canadian football linebackers
San Francisco 49ers players
Barcelona Dragons players
Hamilton Tiger-Cats players
Texas A&M Aggies football players
Sportspeople from Rapides Parish, Louisiana